Kop (Break) is the fifth studio album released in 2002 by the Turkish pop singer Mustafa Sandal.

Track listing

Credits
 Music direction, arrangements: Mustafa Sandal, Volga Tamöz
 Mix-Engineer: Ünal Yüksel
 Publisher: Erol Köse
 Photography: Şafak Taner

Music videos
 "Pazara Kadar"
 "Geçmiş Olsun"
 "Kopmam Lazım (Remix)"

Notes 

Mustafa Sandal albums
2002 albums